Leonid Aleksandrovich Yekimov (born 13 September 1987) is a Russian sport shooter. At the 2006 ISSF World Shooting Championships, he won the junior competition in 25 metre pistol and finished second in 25 metre standard pistol. The following year, although still a junior, he opted to participate in the open class of the European Championships in 10 metre air pistol and helped the Russian team to a gold medal and a new world record, also breaking the junior world record of Kanstantsin Lukashyk in the qualification round. He then proceeded to defeat teammates Mikhail Nestruyev and Vladimir Isakov in the final, to top a Russian triple victory and win his first international senior title. He defended this gold medal the next year after a qualification score of 591 points, two points below the world record.

Yekimov made his Olympic debut in the air pistol competition in Beijing in 2008, and finished sixth. He was also chosen as Sergei Alifirenko's replacement in the rapid fire pistol competition, when Alifirenko, who won gold in Sydney and bronze in Athens, had to withdraw. Although not a renowned rapid fire shooter, Yekimov has won a national competition in the event and when attaining his minimum qualification score for the Olympics, he reached a score of 586 in Munich, only five points behind the world record. In Beijing, Yekimov was in the lead after the first day but dropped to second after the second stage and finally to fourth after the final.

Performance timelines

50 metre pistol

25 metre rapid fire pistol

25 metre standard pistol

10 metre air pistol

Records

References

1987 births
Living people
Russian male sport shooters
ISSF pistol shooters
Shooters at the 2008 Summer Olympics
Shooters at the 2012 Summer Olympics
Olympic shooters of Russia
European Games competitors for Russia
Shooters at the 2015 European Games
Universiade medalists in shooting
Universiade gold medalists for Russia
Medalists at the 2013 Summer Universiade
Shooters at the 2020 Summer Olympics